Dunn & Co. was a well known British chain of menswear retailers.

History
Dunn & Co. was founded in 1887 by George Arthur Dunn, a Quaker, who started by selling hats on the streets of Birmingham. Forty years later he had two hundred hat shops and as many franchises in other stores. These gradually developed into a string of High Street stores specialising in formal wear, especially suits, blazers, tweed sports jackets and flannels.

The company was a stalwart of the British High Street, but found it increasingly difficult to remain relevant in the fast changing retail environment of the 1980s: as new and innovative retailers opened up – with Next for men being a prime example - it struggled to adapt. The company engaged the services of management consultants PricewaterhouseCoopers in a bid to revitalise and refocus, but the programme they initiated failed to make the significant changes necessary to ensure long-term survival.

The group trading started showing serious problems in 1991, with nearly forty shops being sold to Hodges, a private Welsh group which kept the Dunn & Co. name going. In 1994 a majority stake was sold to venture capitalists CinVen, who appointed Anthony Phillips and Jim Bellingham to run the chain.

Demise
In its final year of trading as an independent company, 1996, Dunn & Co. had 130 shops and 429 staff, with a head office in Swansea employing a further 75 workers.

It was losing £1m a year on sales of £25m a year, and when its debts reached £6.4m (with £4m owed to unsecured creditors), CinVen, who by then owned 86% of the company, called in the receivers KPMG, on 19 December 1996.

The brand name was purchased by Ciro Citterio. However, they also went into administration in 2003.

References 

Clothing retailers of the United Kingdom
Defunct retail companies of the United Kingdom
British companies established in 1887
Retail companies established in 1887
Retail companies disestablished in 1996
1996 disestablishments in England
British companies disestablished in 1996